Jean-Charles Moreux (1889– 7 July 1956) was a French architect, and a representative of a rigorous and poetic classicism.

Life
Gaining a diploma at the École des Beaux-arts de Paris in 1922, he was a friend of Jean Lurçat and worked for Jacques Doucet, baron Robert Rothschild and vicomte Charles de Noailles.

Works
 Saint-Cloud, maison Brugier, 1926-1927.
 Saint-Leu-la-Fôret, auditorium for Wanda Landowska, 1926-1927 (private property).
 Paris, avenue Marigny, hôtel particulier for baron Robert Rothschild, 1927-1928.
 Château de Maulny at Montbizot, (Sarthe), 1929-1930.
 Paris, villa Seurat, studio-house for the sculptor Robert Couturier, 1937-1938.
 Saint-Germain-en-Laye La Thébaïde, hôtel particulier for the Véra brothers, (André and Paul), 1924.
 Paris, Hôtel particulier for Bernard Reichenbach, rue Alfred-Dehodencq, 1930-1932.
 Paris, 6, rue de Miromesnil, shop-front of Colette's shop, 1936
 Paris, jardins des Gobelins (square René-Le Gall), 1936-1938.
 Paris, pavillon de la Martinique, île des Cygnes, for the "exposition internationnale des arts et des techniques dans la vie moderne", 1937.
 Cairo, open-air restaurant for the hôtel Sheperd, 1947-1948.
 London, library of the Institut de France, Queensberry place, 1949-1950.
 Paris, musée du Louvre, rearrangement of the salle Rubens, 1952–1953, (destroyed).
 Paris, musée du Louvre, rotonde des Petits cabinets, 14 paintings from the studiolo of duke Federico da Montefeltro (1422–1482), 9 by Joos van Wassenhove and 5 attributed to Pedro Berruguete, 1953 (arrangement destroyed).
 Hamburg, St. Ansgar's and St. Bernard's Church, compleded 1955.

Bibliography
 Susan Day, Jean-Charles Moreux architecte-décorateur-paysagiste, Ed. Norma, 1999.
  Histoire de l'architecture  (PUF, 1968, 10 édition)

References 

1889 births
1956 deaths
People from Saône-et-Loire
20th-century French architects